Sporting Khalsa Football Club are a football club, formed in 1991, members of the , who play their home games at Noose Lane in Willenhall, West Midlands. Being founded by the local Sikh community, they are the first British Asian club to own their own ground, which they bought from Willenhall Town in 2010 after moving from Abbey Park, the former home of Bloxwich Town.

History

The team was founded in 1991 and began playing in the Walsall & District Sunday leagues. They played one season in the West Midlands (Regional) League in 1996–97 before leaving after finishing bottom of the league. They later returned in 2004–05 and were promoted after finishing 5th.

In 2011, Sporting Khalsa were promoted to the Premier Division of the West Midlands (Regional) League Premier Division. Following this success, they formed an U21s team, which plays in the Midland Combination U2ls league. In terms of their youth setup they have a couple of teams in the Midland Junior Premier League as well. Altogether they have 15 teams from U21s to u7s. The majority of their junior teams play in the Walsall minor league. The links between the first team and junior Khalsa teams are very strong with many junior team players being involved during the first team's games.

At the end of the 2012–13 season, Sporting Khalsa redeveloped their ground, changing the size of the pitch, building a new stand, creating new changing rooms and renovating the outside of the pitch and clubhouse. In addition, as part of an ongoing programme of investment at the Aspray Arena, the Black Country Performance Hub was opened, providing state-of-the-art five-a-side facilities and a gymnasium and martial arts space. Following this, in the 2013–14 season guided under the management of Mark Holdcroft, Sporting Khalsa finished in sixth position, their highest finish to date. After this, Holdcroft and Sporting Khalsa decided to part company by mutual consent.

Ian Rowe, who had guided Gornal Athletic to the Midland Alliance in the 2011–12 season, was appointed as manager. The 2014–15 season was very successful with Khalsa winning the West Midlands (Regional) League title by 27 points, finishing on a record 117 points and securing promotion to the Midland Football League Premier Division in the process.

In 2015-16 they reached the fourth qualifying round of the FA Cup where they lost 3–1 at home to F.C. United of Manchester, secured third place in their first season in the Midland Football League and won the JW Hunt Cup, beating Wolverhampton Sporting C.F.C. in the final at Molineux Stadium.

Third spot was to be the prize the following season as well, this time behind champions Alvechurch and runners up Coleshill Town. However, there was good news in the FA Vase where Khalsa made it to the quarter-finals before bowing out to fellow Midland Football League side Coleshill.

The 2017-18 campaign can perhaps best be described as challenging. With a £1m redevelopment of the Aspray Arena taking place, Khalsa relocated to their neighbours AFC Wulfrunians for six months coinciding with them slipping from top of the league to their final fifth-placed finish.

In July 2018, the club officially reopened their Noose Lane ground following a £1m revamp which included the building of new spectator facilities, changing rooms and the installation of a new 5g pitch with a preseason friendly against Hereford FC.

Current squad

Records
FA Cup: Fourth Qualifying Round 2015–16
FA Vase: Quarter finals 2016-17
Record attendance: 2,252 v F.C. United of Manchester, 24 October 2015.

References

External links

Football clubs in England
West Midlands (Regional) League
Football clubs in the West Midlands (county)
Sport in Walsall
1991 establishments in England
Association football clubs established in 1991
Willenhall
Diaspora sports clubs in the United Kingdom
Northern Premier League clubs
Diaspora association football clubs in England